Anameristes doryphora is a species of moth of the family Tortricidae. It is found in China (Hainan).

References

Moths described in 1986
Tortricini
Moths of Asia